Sammy Wilson (16 December 1931 – 8 November 2014) was a Scottish footballer, who played professionally for St Mirren, Celtic, Millwall, Northampton Town and Mansfield Town. Although he only spent two years with Celtic, Wilson may be best-remembered for his role in one famous victory, when he scored their first goal in their record 7–1 victory over Rangers in the 1957 Scottish League Cup Final. Wilson finished his footballing career in the first half of the 1960s, having moved to the north of Scotland to sign for Highland Football League clubs Ross County and then Brora Rangers.

References

External links

1931 births
2014 deaths
St Mirren F.C. players
Celtic F.C. players
Millwall F.C. players
Ross County F.C. players
Scottish Football League players
English Football League players
Association football inside forwards
Footballers from Glasgow
Scottish footballers
Renfrew F.C. players
Place of death missing
Brora Rangers F.C. players
Northampton Town F.C. players
Mansfield Town F.C. players
Scottish Junior Football Association players
Highland Football League players